The Efficiency Decoration is a medal awarded to New Zealand military officers. This medal is awarded to officers who have both served for twelve years continuously and been models of efficiency in that time. First awarded in 1931, it was a replacement for the Colonial Auxiliary Forces Officers Decoration, which itself was only 29 years old in 1931, being first awarded in 1902. Recipients of this medal are also given the designation of 'ED' to use after their name.

See also 
Efficiency Decoration
Efficiency Medal

References

External links
NZDF Medals – The Efficiency Decoration

Military awards and decorations of New Zealand
Long and Meritorious Service Medals of Britain and the Commonwealth